OA-4 may refer to:
 Douglas OA-4 Dolphin
 Douglas OA-4 Skyhawk, a variant of the Douglas A-4 Skyhawk
 Cygnus CRS OA-4, the Orbital Sciences CRS-4 mission